Trolley station is a light rail station in the Central City neighborhood of Salt Lake City, Utah, United States serviced by the Red Line of the Utah Transit Authority's (UTA) TRAX light rail system. The Red Line provides service from the University of Utah to the Daybreak community of South Jordan.

Description 
The station is located at 625 East 400 South (East University Boulevard/SR-186), with the island platform being in the median of 400 South. The vicinity of the station is characterized by intensive and diverse retail development, including supermarkets and the mall in historic Trolley Square (which is one block south), though substantial office buildings and residential areas are also nearby. As part of the UTA's Art in Transit program, the station features tile mosaics, granite pavers, color laminated glass windscreens and steel created by Paul Heath, Victoria Lyons, Michael Moonbird, and Valerie Parker Price collectively entitled Bad Dog Community Art Station. Unlike most TRAX stations, Trolley does not have a Park and Ride lot. The station is part of a railway right of way that was created specifically for the former University Line. The station was opened on 15 December 2001 as part of the University Line and is operated by the Utah Transit Authority.

References 

TRAX (light rail) stations
Railway stations in the United States opened in 2001
Railway stations in Salt Lake City
2001 establishments in Utah